The 1969 Libyan coup d'état, also known as the al-Fateh Revolution or the 1 September Revolution, was carried out by the Free Unionist Officers Movement, a group of military officers led by Colonel Muammar Gaddafi, which led to the overthrow of King Idris I.

Background
The discovery of significant oil reserves in 1959 and the subsequent income from petroleum sales enabled the Kingdom of Libya to transition from one of the world's poorest nations to a wealthy state. Although oil drastically improved the Libyan government's finances, resentment began to build over the increased concentration of the nation's wealth in the hands of King Idris. This discontent mounted with the rise of Nasserism and Arab nationalism/socialism throughout the Arab world.

Coup
On 1 September 1969, a group of about 70 young army officers known as the Free Unionist Officers Movement and enlisted men mostly assigned to the Signal Corps gained control of the government and abolished the Libyan monarchy. The coup was launched at Benghazi; and, within two hours, it was completed. Army units quickly rallied in support of the coup and, within a few days, military control was established in Tripoli and elsewhere throughout the country. Popular reception of the coup, especially by younger people in the urban areas, was enthusiastic. Fears of resistance in Cyrenaica and Fezzan proved unfounded. No deaths or violent incidents related to the coup were reported.

The Free Officers Movement, which claimed credit for carrying out the coup, was headed by a twelve-member directorate that designated itself the Revolutionary Command Council (RCC). This body constituted the Libyan government after the coup. In its initial proclamation on 1 September, the RCC declared the country to be a free and sovereign state called the Libyan Arab Republic, which would proceed "in the path of freedom, unity, and social justice, guaranteeing the right of equality to its citizens, and opening before them the doors of honourable work." The rule of the Turks and Italians and the "reactionary" government which were overthrown were characterised as belonging to "dark ages", from which the Libyan people were called to move forward as "free brothers" to a new age of prosperity, equality, and honour.

The RCC advised diplomatic representatives in Libya that the revolutionary changes had not been directed from outside the country, that existing treaties and agreements would remain in effect, and that foreign lives and property would be protected. Diplomatic recognition of the new government came quickly from countries throughout the world. United States recognition was officially extended on 6 September.

Post-coup events
In view of the lack of internal resistance, it appeared that the chief danger to the new government lay in the possibility of a reaction inspired by the absent King Idris or his designated heir, Hasan ar Rida, who had been taken into custody at the time of the coup along with other senior civil and military officials of the royal government. Within days of the coup, however, Hasan publicly renounced all rights to the throne, stated his support for the new government, and called on the people to accept it without violence.

Idris, in an exchange of messages with the RCC through Egypt's President Nasser, dissociated himself from reported attempts to secure British intervention and disclaimed any intention of coming back to Libya. In return, he was assured by the RCC of the safety of his family still in the country. At his own request and with Nasser's approval, Idris took up residence once again in Egypt, where he had spent his first exile and where he remained until his death in 1983.

On 7 September 1969, the RCC announced that it had appointed a cabinet to conduct the government of the new republic. An American-educated technician, Mahmud Sulayman al-Maghribi, who had been imprisoned since 1967 for his political activities, was designated prime minister. He presided over the eight-member Council of Ministers, of whom six, like Maghrabi, were civilians and two – Adam Said Hawwaz and Musa Ahmad – were military officers. Neither of the officers was a member of the RCC.

The Council of Ministers was instructed to "implement the state's general policy as drawn up by the RCC". The next day the RCC promoted Captain Gaddafi to colonel and appointed him commander-in-chief of the Libyan Armed Forces. Although RCC spokesmen declined until January 1970 to reveal any other names of RCC members, it was apparent from that date onward that the head of the RCC and new de facto head of state was Gaddafi.

Analysts were quick to point out the striking similarities between the Libyan military coup of 1969 and that in Egypt under Nasser in 1952, and it became clear that the Egyptian experience and the charismatic figure of Nasser had formed the model for the Free Officers Movement. As the RCC in the last months of 1969 moved to institute domestic reforms, it proclaimed neutrality in the confrontation between the superpowers and opposition to all forms of colonialism and imperialism.

It also made clear Libya's dedication to Arab unity and to the support of the Palestinian cause against Israel. The RCC reaffirmed the country's identity as part of the "Arab nation" and its state religion as Islam. Parliamentary institutions from the kingdom were dissolved with legislative functions being assumed by the RCC, and the prohibition against political parties was continued, in effect from 1952.

The new government categorically rejected communism – in large part because it was atheist – and officially espoused an Arab interpretation of socialism that integrated Islamic principles with social, economic, and political reform.

See also
1969 Libyan coup d'état attempt
2013 Libyan coup d'état attempt
2014 Libyan coup d'état attempts
Cultural Revolution (Libya)
Egyptian revolution of 1952

References

1960s coups d'état and coup attempts
1969 in Libya
20th-century revolutions
Arab nationalism in Libya
Arab nationalist rebellions
Cold War rebellions
Conflicts in 1969
History of Libya under Muammar Gaddafi
Military coups in Libya
Military history of Libya
Muammar Gaddafi
Nasserism
Republicanism in the Arab world
Revolutions in Libya
September 1969 events in Africa
Socialism in Libya